Catagonium is a genus of moss from the family Catagoniaceae. It is found all over the world, especially the Tropical Region.

Species 
There are 9 species:

 Catagonium brevicaudatum  
 Catagonium complanatum  
 Catagonium emarginatum  
 Catagonium gracile  
 Catagonium mucronatum  
 Catagonium nitens  
 Catagonium nitidum  
 Catagonium politum  
 Catagonium serrulatum

References

Hypnaceae
Moss genera
Taxa named by Karl Müller (bryologist)
Taxa named by Viktor Ferdinand Brotherus